Nordic green left refers to a specific brand of socialism from the Nordic countries that incorporates elements of environmentalism and feminism. Nordic green left parties are organized in:

 a subgroup of the European United Left–Nordic Green Left-group in the European parliament 
 an alliance of political parties called Nordic Green Left Alliance

See also
 NGL (disambiguation)
 Green Left (disambiguation)
 Popular socialism

Nordic Green Left Alliance